Leonard Curryer (1864 – after 1891) was an English footballer who played as a forward for Small Heath. Curryer, a native of Birmingham who also died there, played twice in the Football Alliance in the 1891–91 season, standing in for the injured Harry Morris.

References

1864 births
Year of death missing
Footballers from Birmingham, West Midlands
English footballers
Association football forwards
Birmingham City F.C. players
Date of birth missing
Football Alliance players